Karen Angelo Hækkerup (née Schmidt; born 12 June 1974) is a Danish politician representing the Social Democrats. She was Justice Minister of Denmark from 12 December 2013 to 10 October 2014. Hækkerup resigned her post as Justice Minister in favour of a job as CEO of the Danish Agriculture and Food Council, the largest lobby organisation for the Danish agricultural industry.

References

External links
 

|-

|-

1974 births
Danish Justice Ministers
Danish women business executives
Women nonprofit executives
Government ministers of Denmark
Living people
Social Democrats (Denmark) politicians
21st-century Danish women politicians
Female justice ministers
Women members of the Folketing
Women government ministers of Denmark
Members of the Folketing 2005–2007
Members of the Folketing 2007–2011
Members of the Folketing 2011–2015
20th-century Danish women